This is a list of all personnel changes for the 2009 Women's National Basketball Association off-season and 2009 WNBA season.

Retirement
The following players played their final season in 2008.

Front Office movement

Head coach changes

General Manager changes

Player movement
The following is a list of player movement via free agency and trades.

Trades

Signed from free agency

7-day contracts

Released

Waived

Renounced
Minnesota Lynx
Kristi Harrower (to Sparks)

Training camp cuts
All players here did not make the final roster

WNBA Draft

The 2009 WNBA Draft was held on April 9, 2009 in Secaucus, New Jersey.

First round selections

References

2009 WNBA season